The Encyclopedia Talmudit (  entsiyklopediah talmudiyt) is a Hebrew language encyclopedia that aims to summarize the halakhic topics of the Talmud in alphabetical order.  It began in 1942 and is still an active project , with 46 volumes (plus several index volumes) published so far. Over half of the project is complete, and it is planned to be finished by 2024 with the publishing of thirty more volumes. An English translation, the Encyclopedia Talmudica began to be published in 1969.
It is published by the Torah literature publishing group , named after Rabbi Yitzhak HaLevi Herzog, in Jerusalem.

Formation of the encyclopedia

The project began at the initiative of Rabbi Meir Bar-Ilan (Berlin) (1880–1949), the son of the Netziv. The concept was first described in a 1921 lecture by Chief Rabbi Abraham Isaac Kook, who outlined several projects for Torah scholars, including a work "that elucidates the essence of Torah principles, organized by encyclopedic entries." Bar-Ilan organized a group of notable editors.  The purpose was to summarize all the Talmudic discussions and all the opinions of Rishonim and Acharonim in encyclopedia articles in alphabetical order.

The first edition of the first volume was published in 1947.  This volume included 219 articles in an organized format of summaries.  The same volume was reprinted three more times: in 1947, 1951, and 1955.  After Bar-Ilan died in 1949, it was republished in a newly revised and expanded edition.

In 1947 Encyclopedia Talmudit won the city prize of Tel Aviv for Torah literature to honor the memory of Rabbi Abraham Isaac Kook.

Major Torah scholars, both Hasidim and Mitnagdim, supported the project. Supporters included Rabbi Menachem Mendel Schneerson, Rabbi Moshe Feinstein, Rabbi Yosef Shalom Eliashiv, Rabbi Yochanan Sofer, and others.

The administrator of the encyclopedia from its founding was Rabbi  (1910–2009), who succeeded in securing the initiative with stable financial backing, thanks to his connections with leaders of the Mizrachi movement.

Editors

The first editor-in-chief was Rabbi Shlomo Yosef Zevin (1886–1978).  The first editors were Rabbi Benjamin Rabinovitz-Teomim, Rabbi Shimon Stralitz, Rabbi Yonah Merzbach and Rabbi Alter Hilevitz.

In later years tens of Torah scholars joined the editorial board, among them Rabbi Eliezer Waldenberg, the author of Tzitz Eliezer; Rabbi Isaac Epstein, the judge in the Tel Aviv Beit Din; Rabbi Yehuda Gershoni; Rabbi Shmuel Kroyzer; Rabbi Refael Shmulevitz, the Rosh Yeshiva of the Mir yeshiva (Jerusalem); Rabbi Azriel Levi, the chief editor of the Oz VeHadar version of the Talmud; and others.

In late 2006 Professor Avraham Steinberg took on the role of administrative director.

Contents
Rabbi Zevin's style was to abbreviate and summarize wherever possible.  In the first two volumes he followed an extremely brief format under the influence of Rabbi Bar-Ilan, but in later volumes published after Rabbi Bar-Ilan died the volumes are more encompassing, and include not only the essence of the subject but also many of its details and branched topics.

Rabbi Zevin established the listing of primary and secondary articles and the system of halakhic analysis of the encyclopedia.  He edited the volumes that were published during his lifetime, and prepared other volumes until the end of letter Heth (ח).

The articles are organized in the following order: definition, sources, reasons and derivations, and various opinions.  The first article was Aleph (א) and the last to date has been Kitvei ha-Qodesh (כ).  The extent of development in the articles has expanded over time.

There are two volumes of indexes, including an index of topics and of citations from the Babylonian Talmud.

Other editions
Encyclopedia Talmudit is also published on a computer version on a compact disc as part of the searchable Bar Ilan Responsa Project.  (See Torah database.)

Encyclopedia Talmudica is an English translation, commenced 1969.
The founding editors of the translation were Isidore Epstein and Harry Freedman.

See also
Torah database
Encyclopedia Judaica

References

External links
 Talmudic Encyclopedia English homepage

Hebrew
 Encyclopedia Talmudit homepage
 על האנציקלופדיה בגרסת התקליטור, מאיר בר-אילן (הנכד)
 אורי פז, דם חדש למפעל של דורות, מקור ראשון, ינואר 2007

Talmud
Jewish encyclopedias
1947 non-fiction books
Hebrew-language encyclopedias
Israeli encyclopedias